Dale Church may refer to several churches:

 Dale Church (Fjaler), a church in Fjaler Municipality in Vestland county, Norway
 Dale Church (Luster), a church in Luster Municipality in Vestland county, Norway
 Dale Church (Vaksdal), a church in Vaksdal Municipality in Vestland county, Norway
 Norddal Church, also known as Dale Church, a church in Fjord Municipality in Møre og Romsdal county, Norway

See also
Dal Church, a church in Tinn Municipality in Telemark county, Norway